In enzymology, a quercetin-3-sulfate 3'-sulfotransferase is an enzyme that catalyzes the chemical reaction

3'-phosphoadenylyl sulfate + quercetin 3-sulfate  adenosine 3',5'-bisphosphate + quercetin 3,3'-bissulfate

Thus, the two substrates of this enzyme are 3'-phosphoadenylyl sulfate and quercetin 3-sulfate, whereas its two products are adenosine 3',5'-bisphosphate and quercetin 3,3'-bissulfate.

This enzyme belongs to the family of transferases, specifically the sulfotransferases, which transfer sulfur-containing groups.  The systematic name of this enzyme class is 3'-phosphoadenylyl-sulfate:quercetin-3-sulfate 3'-sulfotransferase. Other names in common use include flavonol 3'-sulfotransferase, 3'-Sulfotransferase, and PAPS:flavonol 3-sulfate 3'-sulfotransferase.

References 

 

EC 2.8.2
Enzymes of unknown structure
Quercetin